The European Parliament election of 2014 took place in Italy on 25 May 2014.

In Veneto the centre-left Democratic Party came largely ahead with 37.5% of the vote, followed by the Five Star Movement, distant second at 19.9%. Among the parties of the governing coalition in the region, Lega Nord (whose regional wing is Liga Veneta) came first with 15.2% of the vote, followed by Forza Italia (14.7%) and the New Centre-Right (3.5), which ran in a joint list with the Union of the Centre. The centre-right's tally, including also Brothers of Italy (3.3%), was 36.7%: it was the first time ever that the centre-left topped the centre-right in a regionwide election. The five most voted candidates in Veneto were Alessandra Moretti (Democratic Party, 138,901 preference votes), Flavio Tosi (Lega Nord, 83,171), Flavio Zanonato (Democratic Party, 80,387), Matteo Salvini (Lega Nord, 67,148) and Mara Bizzotto (Lega Nord, 42,787).

Results

References

Elections in Veneto
European Parliament elections in Italy
Veneto
European Parliament election in Veneto